Southwick is a surname. Notable people with the surname include:

Alfred P. Southwick (1826–1898), American inventor
Cassandra Burnell Southwick (c.1600–1660), early American settler
Clyde Southwick (1886–1961), American baseball player
Dan Southwick, American musician
Danny Southwick (born 1981), American football player
David Southwick (born 1968), Australian politician
Elisha Southwick (1809–1875), American tanner
George N. Southwick (1863–1912), American politician
Lawrence Southwick (c.1600–1660), early American settler
Leslie H. Southwick (born 1950), American judge
Solomon Southwick (1773–1839), New York newspaper publisher and politician
Shawn Southwick, wife of American television and radio host Larry King
Teresa Southwick, American writer
Wayne Southwick (born 1923), American orthopedic surgeon